"Like a Girl in Love" is the second single from Australian recording artist Elen Levon. It was released digitally on 2 March 2012. The song peaked at number 74 on the ARIA Singles Chart, and number 14 on the ARIA Dance Chart.

Music video
The accompanying music video for "Like a Girl in Love" was shot in Cambodia, and premiered online on 8 February 2012. The video depicts Levon and her male love interest going on various adventures in Cambodia, with the occasional close-up of Levon wearing a dress and an updo lip-synching the song.

Live performances
Levon performed "Like a Girl in Love" during the Naughty Nights tour, a joint tour of Australia's pubs and clubs with Marvin Priest. She later performed the song at ANZ Stadium on 25 March 2012, during a match between NRL's Canterbury-Bankstown Bulldogs and Newcastle Knights.

Track listing
Digital EP
 Like a Girl in Love (Radio Edit) – 3:19
 Like a Girl in Love (James Ash Extended Mix) – 5:25
 Like a Girl in Love (Starkillers Remix) – 5:48
 Like a Girl in Love (John Dahlbäck Remix) – 5:39

Charts

References

2012 singles
Elen Levon songs
2012 songs
Ministry of Sound singles